Orosco is a surname of Spanish Basque origin. Notable people with the surname include:

Brian Orosco (born 1998), Argentine soccer-player
Jesse Orosco (born 1957), American baseball player
Raúl Orosco (born 1979), Bolivian soccer-referee

References

Basque-language surnames